Unite is the debut album of the Danish indie pop band A Friend in London. It was released on 21 January 2013 on ArtPeople record label and includes "New Tomorrow", their Danish Eurovision Song Contest 2011 entry that finished fifth in that year's competition. The album also includes a collaboration with Carly Rae Jepsen, who is featured in the track "Rest from the Streets".

Singles
 "New Tomorrow" was released as the lead single from the album on 25 February 2011. It represented Denmark in the Eurovision Song Contest 2011, held in Düsseldorf, Germany.
 "Calling a Friend" was released as the second single from the album on 30 April 2012.
 "Get Rich in Vegas" was released as the third single from the album on 23 July 2012.
 "The Light" was released from the album on 7 February 2011.

Track listing

Chart performance

Release history

References

2013 debut albums
A Friend in London albums